Poley Poley Urey Mon is a 2011 Indian Assamese language drama film directed by Timothy Das Hanche, produced by Phukan Konwar, Purnananda Gogoi and Beauty Baruah under the banner Hills Motion Pictures Association of Diphu. The casts of the movie are Nipon Goswami, Moloya Goswami, Barsha Rani Bishaya, Gayatri Mahanta, Ravi Sarma, Rimpi Das, Parineeta Borthakur, Tarun Arora, Mahika Sharma etc. Bollywood actor Raza Murad and former Assam CM Tarun Gogoi also performed a cameo in this movie.

Cast

Sourabh Hazarika as Partha Hazarika
Gayatri Mahanta as Sangita (Partha's Wife)
Barsha Rani Bishaya as Lalita
Parineeta Borthakur as Pallavi (Partha's Sister)
Ravi Sarma as Proloy (Partha's Brother)
Rimpi Das as Kasturika (Sangita's Sister)
Nipon Goswami as Radhika Mohan Goswami (Satriya Dance Teacher)
Moloya Goswami as Partha, Proloy and Pallavi's Mother
Asthajita Bordoloi as Guest Appearance in Manuhe Manuhor Babe Song
Tarun Arora as Amit
Raza Murad as Amit's Father
Pushpa Verma as Amit's Mother
Mahika Sharma 
Arup Bora as Raja
 Arun Hazarika
 Hiranya Deka as Paniram

Soundtrack

The music of Poley Poley Urey Mon was composed by Timothy Das Hanche, Biman Baruah and Arup Dutta. Dr. Bhupen Hazarika's famous Manuhe manuhor babe was also sung by Asthajita Bordoloi.

See also
Assamese cinema

References

External links 
 

2011 films
Films set in Assam
2010s Assamese-language films